Zoran Levnaić (born 4 April 1987) is a Serbian football manager and former player who is the manager of NOFV-Oberliga Süd side Inter Leipzig. As a player, he spent most of his career playing as a midfielder.

Playing career
Levnaić was born in Otočac, Croatia, but began playing football in the youth squads of FK Partizan in Belgrade, Serbia.

Up to 2010 he played for the Maltese sides of Hibernians, Floriana and Hamrun Spartans. In January 2011 he moved to Kuwaiti side Al-Salmiya SC and in August 2011 to Oikonomos Tsaritsani, who were then playing in the Greek Football League 2.

References

External links
 
 Profile at oikonomos.gr

1987 births
Living people
People from Otočac
Serbs of Croatia
Serbian footballers
Serbian expatriate footballers
Association football midfielders
Floriana F.C. players
Ħamrun Spartans F.C. players
Msida Saint-Joseph F.C. players
Hibernians F.C. players
Al Salmiya SC players
Kuwait Premier League players
Qormi F.C. players
Pembroke Athleta F.C. players
Inter Leipzig players
Expatriate footballers in Malta
Expatriate footballers in Kuwait
Expatriate footballers in Greece
Serbian expatriate sportspeople in Malta
Serbian expatriate sportspeople in Kuwait
Serbian expatriate sportspeople in Greece
Serbian expatriate sportspeople in Germany
Expatriate footballers in Germany
Expatriate football managers in Germany